North Arabian may refer to:
the northern Arabian Peninsula
Ancient North Arabian languages
the Adnanites, a group of Arab tribes
 the North Arabian languages